Clean My Name, Mr. Coroner! is a 2000 Hong Kong crime comedy thriller film written and directed by James Yuen and starring Francis Ng, Ti Lung and Nick Cheung.

Plot
Undercover cop Fred Cheung (Nick Cheung) successfully assisted the police in arresting counterfeiters during an illegal transaction. However, afterwards, the illicit money, along with police officer Herman Law (Calvin Poon), went missing. While searching for Law and the money, Cheung was intercepted by the police, where they discover a headless corpse in the truck of his car. The corpse was later certified by the police as Law. Cheung flees in order to prove his innocence, and hijacks coroner Dr. Keith Ko (Francis Ng). Ko feels something strange about this case, and decides to help Cheung discover the truth to this case.

Cast
Francis Ng as Dr, Keith Ko (高兆祺)
Ti Lung as Officer C.K. Lau (劉Sir)
Nick Cheung as Fred Cheung (張耀輝)
Stephanie Che as Ling
Jerry Lamb as Lo
Joe Ma as Detective Rick
Wayne Lai as Cab driver
Calvin Poon as Herman Law (阿雄)
Kristal Tin as Bobo Lam (林寶儀)
Iris Wong as Dr. Ko's date
Joe Lee as money counterfeiter
Kong Foo-keung as thug

Reception

Critical
Far East Films gave the film a score of four out of five stars and greatly praised Francis Ng's performance. LoveHKFilm gave the film a mixed review, also praising Ng's performance in addition to Ti Lung's performance and calling the film "sporadically entertaining", but criticized its poor direction and recycled script. So Good Reviews gave the film a relatively positive review, praising director James Yuen's direction despite its unoriginal plot, and the performances by Cheung and Ti, and describing Ng as the film's "biggest shining star".

Box office
The film grossed HK$3,796,682 at the Hong Kong box office during its theatrical run from 3 to 22 November 2000.

References

External links

Clean My Name, Mr. Coroner! at Hong Kong Cinemagic

2000 films
2000 crime thriller films
2000s crime comedy films
2000s comedy thriller films
Hong Kong crime thriller films
Hong Kong crime comedy films
Police detective films
2000s Cantonese-language films
Films set in Hong Kong
Films shot in Hong Kong
Films with screenplays by James Yuen
Films directed by James Yuen
2000 comedy films
2000s Hong Kong films